The Blue Ridge gray-cheeked salamander (Plethodon amplus) is a species of salamander in the family Plethodontidae  endemic to the Blue Ridge Mountains of North Carolina, United States. It is one of 55 species in the genus Plethodon and one of the most recently to be described. Its natural habitat is temperate forests. It is threatened by habitat loss.

References

Plethodon
Amphibians of the United States
Amphibians described in 2000
Taxonomy articles created by Polbot
Endemic fauna of North Carolina